Ilan Eshkeri (born 7 April 1977) is a British composer known for his concert music, films scores and artist collaborations.

Early life 
Eshkeri was born to a Jewish family in London. During his childhood, he learned to play the violin and guitar and later went on to play in a rock band. Eshkeri attended Leeds University, where he studied music and English literature. During this time he also worked with fellow film composers Edward Shearmur, Michael Kamen and music producer Steve McLaughlin.

Career 
His extensive catalogue of film and TV scores include Still Alice, Stardust, The Young Victoria, Doctor Thorne, Shaun The Sheep and David Attenborough's Natural History Museum Alive. Additional work includes music for Collide (Starring Nicholas Hoult, Felicity Jones, Ben Kingsley and Anthony Hopkins) and The Kaiser's Last Kiss (starring Lily James), both released in 2016. Eshkeri has collaborated with artists David Gilmour, Annie Lennox, KT Tunstall, Amon Tobin and Nick Hodgson (Kaiser Chiefs) among others. He recently worked with the European Space Agency on music for astronaut Tim Peake's Principia mission. In addition he has conducted his own works at The Louvre in Paris, The Rudolfinum in Prague and The Royal Albert Hall in London. 

In 2012, Eshkeri was commissioned by Keith H. Yoo to write a composition for Yoo Byung-euns photo exhibition in the Tuileries Garden of The Louvre in Paris. The twelve-part tone poem titled "Through My Window" was pre-recorded in Abbey Road Studios by the London Metropolitan Orchestra, the 46 minutes composition played alongside the exhibition, and it was later released on Blu-ray Disc.

In 2014, Eshkeri composed music for the video game The Sims 4 as well as several of its expansion packs.

2017 saw Eshkeri compose a ballet with famed photographer and director David LaChapelle and infamous ballet dancer Sergei Polunin titled Narcissus and Echo.  The performance debuted March 14th, 2017 at the Sadler's Wells Theatre in London.

Discography

Theatrical films

Short films

Television films

Television series

Video games

Awards 
In 2005, Ilan was nominated for Discovery of the Year with Layer Cake from The World Soundtrack Academy Awards.

Eshkeri was named Best New Composer of 2007 by the International Film Music Critics Association for his score to Stardust.

2007 International Film Music Critics Association nomination for Best Original Fantasy Score: Stardust

2008 Malibu Film Festival Winner for Best Soundtrack: Strength & Honour

2010 BAFTA nomination for Best Music: Sex & Drugs & Rock & Roll (music producer)

2010 Ivor Novello Awards nomination for Best Original Film Score: The Young Victoria

2020 SCL Awards nomination for Outstanding Original Score for Interactive Media: Ghost of Tsushima

2021 BAFTA nomination for Best Music: Ghost of Tsushima

2021 24th Annual D.I.C.E. Awards Winner for Outstanding Achievement in Original Music Composition: Ghost of Tsushima

References

External links 
 
 
 

1977 births
20th-century British male musicians
Alumni of the University of Leeds
English classical composers
English film score composers
English male classical composers
English male film score composers
English people of French descent
English people of Israeli descent
English people of Tunisian descent
Living people
Musicians from London
Neoclassical composers
People of Tunisian-Jewish descent
Varèse Sarabande Records artists